Stabilization is a dynamic to stabilize a region deemed unstable, as part of counter-insurgency in a war.  Stabilization programs can include local development activities, like building roads and bridges, water wells, schools, and clinics in remote areas. However, there needs to be an understanding of the situation at the beginning of the intervention (a "baseline") in order to measure stability and any improvements

Headquarters Rapid Reaction Corps – France has used a definition of stabilization which runs "creating the necessary conditions for the normalisation of the situation, particularly in the field of security, and thereby enabling functioning state institutions."

See also
Stabilization, Security, Transition, and Reconstruction Operations
United Nations Stabilisation Mission in Haiti

References

Military doctrines